LaFerrari, project name F150 is a limited production mid-engine mild hybrid sports car built by Italian automotive manufacturer Ferrari. LaFerrari means "The Ferrari" in Italian and some other Romance languages, in the sense that it is the "definitive" Ferrari.

Design development
Nine conceptual design studies were considered for the V12 hybrid flagship in 2011, reduced to five in April 2011 (three by Ferrari Centro Stile and two by Pininfarina). Of these, two full-size concepts were built: LaFerrari Concept Manta (internal designation: 2011 Model 2) and LaFerrari Concept Tensostruttura (internal designation 2011 Model 3). These were unveiled at the Ferrari Museum in Maranello, Italy and Ferrari World in Abu Dhabi. The final design of LaFerrari is similar to the Manta concept (Model 2).

The Ferrari Centro Stile cars designed after LaFerrari have design elements reminiscent of the Tensostruttura concept (Model 3) e.g. the SF90 Stradale.

Variants

LaFerrari (2013–2016)

LaFerrari is based on findings from testing of the FXX development prototype and on research being conducted by the Millechili Project at the University of Modena. Only 499 units were produced, and each cost more than 1 million Euros.

The car was unveiled at the 2013 Geneva Auto Show, followed by Auto Shanghai 2013, 2013 Tour Auto Optic 2000, 2013 Supercar Chronicle, Italian Chamber of Commerce in Japan.

LaFerrari Aperta (2016–2018)

LaFerrari Aperta is the open-top version of LaFerrari. Initially, 200 cars were sold with an additional nine reserved for use during the Ferrari 70th Anniversary celebrations. One more unit was later sold by auction. The Aperta comes with a removable carbon-fiber hardtop and a removable canvas soft top. Other changes include more efficient powertrain's control electronics, re-angled radiators to direct airflow out along the underbody rather than over the bonnet, a longer front air dam to help increase downforce, an L-shaped flap on the upper corner of each windscreen pillar to reduce compression on the rear of the cabin in the absence of a roof, different door opening angles with different wheel arches and a new carbon-fiber insert allowing the doors to rotate.

The car was unveiled at the 2016 Paris Motor Show. Like past open-top Ferrari models, it uses the Aperta label to denote its removable roof. According to Ferrari, all 200 units were already pre-sold to customers via invitation.

Specifications

LaFerrari is the first full hybrid produced by the Italian automotive marque, providing the highest power output of any Ferrari road car whilst decreasing fuel consumption by 40 percent. Ferrari claims CO2 emissions of 330 g/km. It is mated to a 7-speed dual-clutch transmission.

Equipment

The car is equipped with carbon-ceramic Brembo brake discs at the front (398 mm) and rear (380 mm), The car is equipped with Pirelli P Zero Corsa tires measuring 265/30 R 19 (front) and 345/30 R 20 (rear) respectively.

The car uses a carbon fiber monocoque structure designed by Ferrari's F1 technical director Rory Byrne, with a claimed 27 percent more torsional rigidity and 22 percent more beam stiffness than its predecessor. It has a double wishbone suspension in the front and a multi-link suspension in the rear.

LaFerrari has several electronic controls including an electronic stability control, high-performance ABS/EBD (anti-lock braking system/electronic brake distribution), EF1-Trac F1 electronic traction control integrated with the hybrid system, E-Diff 3 third-generation electronic differential, SCM-E Frs magnetorheological damping with twin solenoids (Al-Ni tube), and active aerodynamics, which are controlled by 21 of LaFerrari's onboard computers, to enable maximum performance. The body computer system is developed by Magneti Marelli Automotive Lighting.

Performance
Ferrari states that the car has a top speed of 352 km/h (218 mph). However, the 0-300 figure was later debunked by multiple sources. Its verified 0-300 time is 21.99 seconds. Ferrari also claims that the car has lapped its Fiorano Test Circuit in 1:19.70.

Design

The design of the V12 flagship received no input from Pininfarina, making it the first Ferrari since the Bertone-styled 1973 Dino 308 GT4 not to have Pininfarina bodywork or another styling. This decision is a rare exception to the collaboration between Ferrari and Pininfarina that began in 1951. However, Ferrari has stated that there are no plans to end business relations with Pininfarina.

The steering wheel has integrated controls and paddle-shifters directly fixed to the steering column, a solution that allows better use in all conditions. The "bridge" which exists between the two seats, designed like a suspended wing, is home to other instruments linked to the dual-clutch gearbox. The instrumentation consists of a  TFT display with the option to choose between two layouts and can host data from the telemetry system.

Recall
LaFerrari coupés were offered a replacement fuel tank due to the possible incorrect adhesion of a layer of paint on the fuel tank leading to a possible fire.

Eighty-five LaFerrari coupés between 2014 and 2015 model years were recalled due to headrests from Lear's L32 seat failing to absorb the required amount of energy, and the tyre-pressure monitoring system displaying the wrong message when a tire suffered a puncture.

Auction history
The production of the 500th LaFerrari coupé was announced on 31 August 2016. The vehicle was to be sold at auction to benefit the people of central Italy affected by the August 2016 Central Italy earthquake on 24 August 2016. Ultimately, it was put up for auction on 3 December 2016, by RM Sotheby's at the Ferrari Finali Mondiali weekend at Daytona International Speedway. All proceeds went to the National Italian American Foundation’s Earthquake Relief Fund. Sales proceeds amounted to US$7.5 million.

On 3 December 2016, a LaFerrari was auctioned off for US$7 million (£5,743,500.00) making this car "the most valuable 21st century automobile ever sold at auction" according to the automotive press. In 2017, the last unit of LaFerrari Aperta was auctioned for charity for US$10 million. Given the charitable nature of both of these auctions, car valuation experts do not consider the US$7 million Coupe sale price nor the US$10 million Aperta sale price as an accurate reflection of the value of the cars, which are closer to US$4 million (coupe) and US$7 million (Aperta).

Marketing
Hublot Manufacture produced 60 MP-05 "LaFerrari" hand-wound tourbillon wristwatches inspired by LaFerrari coupé. The watch has 50 days of power reserve due to the usage of 11 barrels. The more barrels it has, the more it can lengthen the power reserve, but the barrels are usually used to increase precision.

Gallery

See also 
 List of production cars by power output

References

External links

 

Ferrari vehicles
Cars introduced in 2013
Sports cars
Flagship vehicles
Hybrid electric cars
Rear mid-engine, rear-wheel-drive vehicles